Coloured people in Namibia are people with both European and African, especially Khoisan and Bantu ancestry, as well as Indian, Malay, and Malagasy ancestry especially along the coast and areas bordering South Africa. Coloureds have immigrated to Namibia, been born in Namibia or returned to the country. These distinctively different periods of arrivals, from diverse backgrounds and origins have led to a diverse Coloured population. This diversity was even further exploited by South African officials who referred to three distinct groups amongst the coloureds, namely: "Baster", "Cape Coloureds" and "Namibian Coloureds".

In addition, another element in the coloured makeup was the coloured community in the enclave of Walvis Bay (which remained part of South Africa until 1994) that was closely linked to the people and traditions of the Cape Coloured.

The biggest cultural clash occurred in the mid-1980s when the school students were becoming politically aware through teachers returning primarily from the University of the Western Cape (UWC). This led to them challenging their elders (elected to the Coloured Councils and Rehoboth self-government) who were anti-SWAPO. This embracing of black nationalism, and rejecting of the term "so-called coloured" led to many young coloured people rejecting their cultural history and insisting on a racially unified, Independent Namibia. Many would agree with Norman Duncan who asserted that "…there‘s no such thing as a coloured culture, coloured identity."

However, since the early 2000s, more and more writings have appeared arguing that Coloureds are being marginalised.

History
The coloured people represent a very wide range of genetic and cultural backgrounds. They are a mixed race with European and African ancestry. Their history under the rule of South Africa was very similar to that of the Cape Coloured.
The general consensus is that coloureds accept the Seven Steps of District Six to show their lineage to include:
 Indegenes (including Khoe) San, Khoe and amaXhosa in the Cape and the baSotho and baTswana;
 Slaves
 Free blacks
 Europeans
 Maroons (runaway slaves, free black rebels, mixed 'Baster' descendants of indigenes and slaves, non-conformists Europeans, escaped convicts, and eccentric missionaries)
 Exiles and refugees
 Indentures and migrants (people who owed debts for example, and other economic reasons)

After World War I
A coloured pressure group, the African People's Organisation (APO) opposed the transfer of the German colony to the South African Authority. From the end of World War I, when South Africa took over the administration of South West Africa (now Namibia), more Cape Coloureds entered the territory. These settlers petitioned for permission to create a coloured township, and this was granted in 1921 by the South African Department of Native Affairs. The first coloured township was built in Windhoek north of the Old Location, in the area of present-day Pionierspark.

The South West African (SWA) Administration and white settlers distinguished three distinct groups amongst the Coloureds:
 Baster
 Cape Coloureds
 Namibian Coloureds

The first local branch of the APO was established in February 1923. Its aims were to defend "the Social Political and Civil Rights of the Cape Coloured Community throughout the SW Protectorate". Two years later, the African National Bond (ANB), another political organisation with its aim of representing the Coloured community in South West Africa was established. Both the APO and ANB sympathised with the two South Africa "white" parties, (South African Party and National Party).

The SWA Administration dealt a significant blow to the status of the "Coloured" group when it promulgated Proclamation No 34 of 1924 (Native Urban Areas Proclamation). The proclamation states that "a coloured person who lives in the native location shall be regarded as native". The Colour Bar Law of 1926 that reserved certain positions in the mining industry for Whites was made applicable in South West Africa.

In 1946, Andrew Kloppers moved to Windhoek from South Africa. Before his arrival he was involved in politics in the Cape and was a member of the Kleurling Ouer-Onderwyser Vereniging (KOOV), the Coloured Parents-Teachers Organisation. In 1947 he forms the South West African Coloured Teachers' Association (SWACTA). Clemens Kapuuo becomes the President of the South West Africa Coloured Teachers Association from 1950 to 1953.

In 1950, the National Party of SWA (NPSWA) wins the elections of the Legislative Assembly. The blurring of ethnic lines between the "Coloureds" and poor whites is the major motivation for the introduction of the Group Areas Act in 1950. The Act prescribes ownership and occupancy of land on racial grounds.

On 18 April 1955, SWACTA and SWA Coloured People's Bond (SWACPB) present a petition to the SWA Administration and the South African Department of Native Affairs for the creation of a new "coloured" township in Windhoek. In addition, SWACTA requests the establishment of a Council for Coloured Affairs. Till this point, the "coloured" population in Windhoek is represented by a "coloured" member on the Native Advisory Board of the Old Location.

Herman Andimba Toivo ya Toivo launches the Ovamboland People's Organisation in Cape Town on 2 August 1957. Among the founding members are "coloured" political activists, Ottiliè Schimming and Kenneth Abrahams.

Two "coloured" organisations are established in 1959:
 SWA Coloured Organisation (SWACO), with a pro South African stance; and
 Volksorganisasie van Suidwes-Afrika (People's Organisation of Southwest-Africa), which is anti-SA.
Both parties oppose the creation of the new "coloured" township, Khomasdal, to be built west of the town Centre of Windhoek.

On 10 December 1959,the police move into the "Old Location" to break up a crowd of people demonstrating against the moves to Khomasdal and Katutura, the "coloured" and "black" townships. The first shot fired killed the "coloured" leader, Willem Cloete, the representative on the Native Advisory Board. According to official reports 11 people were killed and 25 injured.

Coloureds' organisations
 Coloured Advisory Council
 Coloured Council
 Council for Coloured Affairs
 Federal Coloured People's Party (FCPP)
 South West Africa Coloured Organisation (SWACO)
 South West Africa Coloured Peoples' Bond (SWACPB)
 South West African Coloured Teachers' Association (SWACTA)
 South West African Labour (SWALP)

Namibian coloureds

Historical
 Johann Friederich Hein (1826–1902), catechist, evangelist and teacher in the Richtersveld. First coloured ordained minister of the Rhenish Missionary Society in 1857, after much resistance from Germany owing to his classification as "coloured".
 William Worthington Jordan (1849–1886), hunter, trader, scout and politician. Trekboer group leader who helped found the Republic Upingtonia
 Edward Ricketts, trader at Tsub|Garis, an old settlement between Mariental and Maltahöhe.

Politics
 Hans Beukes, writer and activist. One of the early petitioners for Namibian independence at the United Nations
 Hermanus Beukes, shoemaker at Rehoboth. One of the early petitioners at the United Nations against the South African administration of South West Africa
 Bezuidenhout, Dawid, Teacher and politician
 Diergaardt, Reggie
 Hartung, Charlie, National Independence Party candidate to the South West Africa Coloured Council on 30 October 1974.
 Julius, Joey, Politician and leader of the Democratic People's Party (est. 1982)
 Kloppers, Andrew, Politician. Founder of South West African Coloured Teachers' Association (SWACTA) in 1947, later leader of the Labour Party and Chairman of the Coloured Council for 12 years – 1962 to 1974.
 Krohne, Albert, National Independence Party candidate to the South West Africa Coloured Council on 30 October 1974.
 Phillips, Willem "Billy", Politician and leader of the Namibia Volksparty (People's Party) (est. 1988).
 Nora Schimming-Chase, Politician. Her parents were Otto Schimming and Charlotte Schimming, née Freiser.

Business
 Navin Morar, Entrepreneur and first President of the post-Apartheid chamber of commerce and industry. Though of Indian descent, he was classified as coloured. Indians had to receive special permission and travelling papers to enter the administered territory of South West Africa.

See also

Colored
Goffal
One-drop rule
Pencil test
Passing (racial identity)
Culture of South Africa
Griqua
Basters
Burghers
Anglo-Indian
Anglo-Burmese
Melungeon
Mestizo
Métis in Canada
Sandra Laing

References

External links
Bibliography of the Coloured identity – short overviews of articles and book on the coloured identity in Southern Africa
2001 Digital Census Atlas
KakDuidelik.co.za – Die ding ruk mal, a coloured community portal

Ethnic groups in Namibia
Multiracial affairs in Africa
 

af:Kleurling
ar:ملونون
bg:Цветнокожи
de:Coloured
es:Colorado (persona)
eo:Koloraj sudafrikanoj
fr:Coloured
hr:Obojeni
he:צבעונים
nl:Kleurling
ja:カラード
pl:Kolorowi
ru:Цветные
sh:Južnoafrički Mulati
fi:Värilliset